Gladys Iola Tantaquidgeon (June 15, 1899 – November 1, 2005) was a Mohegan medicine woman, anthropologist, author, tribal council member, and elder based in Connecticut.

As a young girl, she was selected by women elders for training in traditional pharmacology and culture. She studied anthropology at the University of Pennsylvania with Frank Speck. Beginning in 1934, Tantaquidgeon  worked with the Bureau of Indian Affairs for more than a decade, including several years among western Native American tribes. Together with her father and brother, in 1931 she founded the Tantaquidgeon Indian Museum, the oldest to be owned and operated by Native Americans.

She published several books about Native American traditional medicine and healing with plants. For years she preserved vital records and correspondence of tribal members, which proved integral to their making the case for federal recognition, which the Mohegan received in 1994. That year, Tantaquidgeon was inducted into the Connecticut Women's Hall of Fame.

Biography 
Gladys Tantaquidgeon was the third of seven children born to Mohegan parents, John and Harriet Fielding Tantaquidgeon. They lived on Mohegan Hill in Quinnetucket (Uncasville, in New London County, Connecticut). She was a 10th-generation descendant of the Mohegan chief Uncas, who was prominent in the colonial era. Culturally, the Mohegan tribe is Algonkian; linguistically, they speak one of the many Algonquian languages. In childhood, Gladys learned traditional practices, beliefs, and lore from nanus, respected women elders.  By age five, the tribal nanus had chosen her to be schooled in the traditions of Mohegan culture. One of her mentors was the Mohegan traditionalist Fidelia Fielding (1827–1908). From Fielding, she learned the ways of the makiawisug who guard the healing plants. Another mentor was her maternal aunt, Nanu Emma Fielding Baker (1828-1916). In 1992 Baker was posthumously elected by the tribe as the Mohegan Tribal Medicine Woman and was inducted into the Connecticut Women's Hall of Fame for her work in education and preservation. Gladys started studying with her aunt in 1904, specializing in traditional herbal medicine, and attending classes in local schools.

In 1919, at the age of 20, Tantaquidgeon attended the University of Pennsylvania to study anthropology. Penn anthropologist Frank Speck met Gladys as a child while he was working with her nanu Fidelia Fielding. When Gladys was old enough, Speck invited her to study with him at Penn; he arranged housing with foreign students at his home in Swarthmore, enrolled her in classes, and enlisted her as a fieldwork assistant to broaden her understanding of Native American cultures. Tantaquidgeon later did field work related to the Lenape and other eastern Algonquian tribes. She expanded her knowledge of traditional pharmacopeia by researching herbal medicine practices among many related East Coast tribes.

From 1934 to 1947, at the time of the Indian Reorganization Act and the Indian New Deal under the administration of President Franklin D. Roosevelt, Tantaquidgeon started work with the US Bureau of Indian Affairs. She was hired in 1934 under the Wheeler-Howard Act to administer social service benefits for Indians. At first she was assigned to the Yankton Sioux Indian Reservation in South Dakota.

In 1938 Tantaquidgeon transferred to the Indian Arts and Crafts Board to serve as a "Native Arts Specialist". Working in the Dakotas, Montana and Wyoming, she helped indigenous artisans preserve traditional skills and arts. In addition, she helped them form cooperatives and other institutions for the sale and management of their arts. She developed ways for tribes to revive their cultural practices. According to the Mohegan Tribal Historian Melissa Fawcett, while working for the federal Indian Arts and Crafts Board, Tantaquidgeon also helped preserve customs that had been prohibited in the 19th century, such as the Ghost Dance and the Sun Dance. Part of Tantaquidgeon's job was to encourage the restoration of these and other previously prohibited traditional practices.

In 1931, Tantaquidgeon worked with her brother Harry, a former chief, and father John to found the Tantaquidgeon Indian Museum. It is the oldest such museum to be owned and operated by Native Americans.  After concluding her government service in 1947, Tantaquidgeon returned to Mohegan Hill, Uncasville. She worked full-time at the museum for the next 50 years, until 1998.

As a librarian in the Niantic Women's Prison in the late 1940s, Tantaquidgeon had helped minority women. During the 1970s and 1980s, she also served on the Mohegan Tribal Council, encouraging the preservation and revival of tribal customs and language. During the 20th century, Tantaguidgeon served as the special guardian of Mohegan Hill 

Tantaquidgeon published several books in her lifetime about traditional herbal medicine.  Her best-known work, A Study of Delaware Indian Medicine Practices and Folk Beliefs (1942) was reprinted in 1972, 1995 and 2000 as Folk Medicine of the Delaware and Related Algonkian Indians. In 1992 she was elected as the Tribal Medicine Woman of the Mohegan. She  preserved numerous records and tribal correspondence in boxes under her bed. These proved critical as documentation to aid the tribe's case for federal recognition. The tribe proved community continuity and was acknowledged as federally recognized in 1994, as part of a settlement linked to their claim for the lands that make up the present-day Mohegan reservation.

Dr. Gladys Tantaquidgeon was the great-aunt of Melissa Tantaquidgeon Zobel, an author and the current Mohegan Medicine Woman.

Legacy, awards and honors
 As an "outstanding role model", Tantaquidgeon was awarded the 'Tiffany Jewel' by the University of Connecticut.
 Connecticut Education Association's Friend of Education Award
 For "consistent endeavor in the area of social justice", she received the National Organization for Women’s Harriet Tubman Award in 1996. 
 She received honorary doctorates from the University of Connecticut (Doctor of Humane Letters degree, 1987) and Yale University (1994).
 In 1994, she was inducted into the Connecticut Women's Hall of Fame.
 Her 100th birthday, June 15, 1999, was declared as 'Gladys Tantaquidgeon Day' by Gov. John G. Rowland of Connecticut; and it was marked in the U.S. Congress by Hon. Sam Gejdenson.
 Her likeness was carved out of sacred basswood and resides on the Mohegan Reservation.

Notes 
Footnotes

References

Further reading

External links
 Gladys Tantaquidgeon biography , The Mohegan Tribe, official website
 Gladys Tantaquidgeon Collection, Hartford Courant newspaper articles
 Tantaquidgeon Indian Museum, Connecticut Office of Tourism
  — Inductee biography

1899 births
2005 deaths
American centenarians
American women historians
20th-century American anthropologists
20th-century Native Americans
Historians of Native Americans
Indigenous American traditional healers
Native American anthropologists
Native American women in politics
Native American women writers
Native American writers
People from Montville, Connecticut
University of Pennsylvania alumni
Women centenarians
American Folklorists of Color
Mohegan people
Native American people from Connecticut
20th-century American women
20th-century American people
20th-century Native American women
Historians from Connecticut
21st-century Native Americans
21st-century Native American women